Rati Aleksidze (born 3 August 1978 in Tbilisi, Georgia) is a former football striker from Georgia.

Career 
His club career started in Dinamo Tbilisi in the 1996/97 season. His goal-scoring abilities helped them win the league titles in 1997, 1998 and 1999 as well as the 1997 cup. During his Dinamo career Aleksidze scored 33 goals in 71 appearances, and especially the 12 goals in 14 games in the 1999/00 season attracted the interest of bigger European clubs. He was taken on trial to English team Chelsea, who decided to buy him. Aleksidze found first team opportunities at Chelsea hard to come by, however, as he only played in two league games and one European match, all as substitute. Released by Chelsea in September 2001, he eventually returned to Dinamo where he scored nine goals in his first season. In 2004, he was bought by Russian team FC Rostov, then retired from his professional career and returned to Georgia. In July 2008 he made a comeback, playing for FC Lokomotivi Tbilisi. Then in January 2009 he joined the Hungarian club Győri ETO FC.

International 
Due to career difficulties he lost his place on the national team, for which he scored 2 goals in 19 caps between 1998 and 2004.

References

External links 
GeorgianSoccer.com

1978 births
Living people
Footballers from Tbilisi
Footballers from Georgia (country)
Association football forwards
Georgia (country) international footballers
Georgia (country) under-21 international footballers
FC Dinamo Tbilisi players
Chelsea F.C. players
FC Rostov players
FC Lokomotivi Tbilisi players
Győri ETO FC players
Erovnuli Liga players
Premier League players
Russian Premier League players
Nemzeti Bajnokság I players
Expatriate footballers from Georgia (country)
Expatriate footballers in England
Expatriate footballers in Russia
Expatriate footballers in Hungary
Expatriate sportspeople from Georgia (country) in England
Expatriate sportspeople from Georgia (country) in Russia
Expatriate sportspeople from Georgia (country) in Hungary